Zablaće is a village in the municipality of Šabac, Serbia. According to the 2002 census, the village has a population of 674 people.

References

Populated places in Mačva District